Gaskoin Richard Morden Wright (18 April 1860 – 10 September 1923) was an English surgeon and missionary who founded the St Luke's Hospital of Nablus while he served with the Church Mission Society(CMS).  St. Lukes Hospital remains the only charitable hospital in Nablus, Palestine as of 2022.  Wright attended Surrey County School and St. Bartholomew's Teaching Hospital. He also published on the use of turpentine in gallstone disease. He was registered as a surgeon and physician in 1883.  In 1890 he was accepted by the CMS working initially in Uganda. In October 1893, Wright went to Palestine, where he had his largest impact. Wright died in 1923 in Metheringham, Lincolnshire, England.

Early life 
Wright was born on the 18th of April 1860, in Wickhambrook, Suffolk, England. He was born to Morden Carthew Wright (1836–1886) and Arabella Hutfield Sherry (1837–1881). Wright grew up in Surgery, Wickhambrook, Suffolk, England. Wright had several brothers and sisters, including his brother Sacheverel Henry Wright (1863–1937), sister Amelia Ann Frances Wright (1864–1864), brother William Carthew Wright (1865–), and brother Percy Edward Wright (1867–1945). Wright lived in Surrey until he was 11, when he moved to Walworth Road, Lambeth, London, England. He and his family continued living there until 1881, when he moved to 128 Walworth Road, Newington, London, England, with his father.

Education 
Wright attended Surrey County School, a public school in Southeast England. For medical school, Wright attended St. Bartholomew's Teaching Hospital in West Smithfield, London. Upon graduating from St. Bartholomew, Wright became a member of the Royal College of Surgeons of Manchester in 1883. In 1883 he also became Licentiate of the Royal College of Physicians in London.   After this, he briefly worked as a house-surgeon in Lancashire.

Family life 
In October 1885 Wright married Catherine Elizabeth Denton (1860–1890) in Ormskirk, Lancashire, England. Wright had one daughter and two sons with Catherine named Herbert Morden Wright (1886–1969), Dorothy Hope Wright (1889–1979) and Eric Devereux Morden Wright. After his wife's death Wright remarried Elizabeth (Elise) Kauffmann, a fellow C.M.S missionary. They had four children Morden Hutfield Wright (1897–1967), Winifred Hope Wright (1899), Kathleen Ethel Wright (1902), and Gaskoin Montague Morden Wright (1904–1970). Wright's children were all born in Palestine due to his missionary work. Furthermore, his son, Gaskoin Montague Morden Wright also became a physician and surgeon and was a C.M.S missionary.

Mission work

Uganda mission 
On November 4, 1890, Wright was accepted as a missionary by the Church Mission Society (C.M.S). Wright's first mission was in Equatorial Africa in 1891. Wright volunteered to be part of the missions in Uganda in a town hall meeting in Salford, England in 1981. Wright was the first member of the Manchester Lay Workers Union to volunteer to work in a foreign country. On April 21, a meeting was held at the C.M.S Manchester Association Hall to bid farewell to Wright and his companions before they left for Africa. Wright left for Africa on May 7, 1891 and was accompanied by the Rev. R.P Ashe, Rev. G. H. V. Greaves, Mr. Hubbard, and Mr. Walter Collins. Rev Greaves died of dysentery on July 12. Wright and Collin reached Uganda on October 31, 1891.

Shortly after arriving in Uganda, Wright and his crew began working with patients. Work included daily prayer and bible reading and church on Sunday with the Church of England service. Wright strongly believed that spreading the word of God was an essential part of his missionary work and felt that God had sent him on his mission to Uganda.

Wright's service in Uganda was marked by significant illness. Wright was sick for several months in Spring 1892. Months later, in August 1892, Wright suffered an extreme case of Blackwater Fever. After that, he had an attack of dysentery, which caused him to lose his strength. After this, he was ordered by Macpherson of the I.B.E.A company to return to Engalnd.  Wright left Africa on September 26, 1982, accompanied by Mr. F.C. Smith, who was also sick. They arrived in London on January 17, 1983.

On his retrun, he stayed engaged in missionary service as documented by a sermon about the manners and traditions of the native people of Uganda during the annual C.M.S Sermon in Macclesfield, Cheshire, England in October 1893.

Nablus mission and Founding St. Luke's Hospital 
In November 1983, Wright was forbidden by the Medical Board to go to Uganda and was instead appointed to Palestine. On January 5, 1984, Wright left London for Constantinople en route to Jaffa with the support of St. Philips Episcopal Church. Wright reached Nablus, Palestine, the site of his most significant missionary work, on February 14, 1894. After arriving at Nablus, Wright opened a temporary hospital. After people found out that a European doctor opened a hospital nearby, patient volume increased, with Wright and his team treating about 200 to 250 cases each week. Wright also opened a dispensary nearby despite opposition from the local authorities.

Opposition to Wright's work came from his attempts to teach the local people about Christianity. On November 8, 1895, Wright's team and a German clergyman were attacked by a mob of about 500 people. While a Syrian C.M.S. worker was hit with a rock on the head, nobody was fatally injured. During the attack, Wright was in a conference in Jerusalem and tried to get the female workers of his team to Jaffa. Their arrival was inhibited by military activity. After the attack, the C.M.S Wali in Beirut requested protection from the governor for the Christian missionaries. In response, the governor sent 3500 troops to protect the CMS missionaries including Wright and his team.

Opposition continued to Wright's missionary work, and many people sent petitions to the governor to shut down the hospital. Despite this, Wright continued working and expanded the Women's wing to accommodate the 10,000 person yearly increase in patients. In 1896 Wright requested funding from CMS for a new building, as the hospital he built  frequently flooded. Wright expressed wanting to talk openly about Christ and aid people that wanted to convert to Christianity. The request for funding for a new hospital was denied due to lack of funds.

In 1898 Wright applied for funding for a small hospital again. He was initially denied by the new governor, who reportedly requested a bribe. However, the Secretary for the British Embassy, Arthur Ponsonby went to Nablus and demanded that Wright's team be able to build a wall to expand their existing hospital.

In 1989 Wright became sick again for three months and his team took over his work. On April 2, 1898, he went back to England with his wife to attend the May 17th C.M.S. committee. Wright and his wife returned to Nablus on December 8, 1898.

On February 27, 1900, Gaskoin briefly went back to England and returned on March 29 back to Nablus.

In 1900 Gaskoin reported that the new hospital increased efficiency and patient treatment volume. This hospital became the only hospital opened in the region as both the government and military hospitals closed. St Luke's hospital offered church services in the mornings and evenings. There was also a catechist in the women's ward. In this hospital worked Wright, Daoud Katibeh, a local doctor and nurses, Ms. Bedells, Ms.Kitchen, and Ms. Lawford. The hospital had forty beds and was essential during the cholera outbreak of 1902 when 500 people died. Hospital volume was approximately 400 people a year. The government referred sick prisoners to the hospital to be treated.

On May 26, 1903, again sick, Wright went back to England. In his place was first Lasbrey, who had a hospital in Old Cairo. Lasbrey had to leave shortly after to return to Old Cairo. Afterward, Doctor Cooper, another C.M.S. missionary took control of the hospital. After the hospital closed in September, Doctor Daoud was left solely in charge of the hospital for October. Afterward, Cooper was called back by the C.M.S. until Wright returned to Nablus on March 25, 1904.

In 1906 Wright added two recovery wards to accommodate the growing number of patients that visited the hospital.

On June 27, 1910, Wright and his family went back to England. They returned on September 29 to Nablus.

In 1917 Wright retired from missionary service because of the start of World War I.

Legacy 
The St Luke's Hospital of Nablus that Wright founded is still in operation in 2022. It is the only charitable hospital in Nablus. Wright also published a book titled, “Value of Turpentine in Gallstone Operants.” When Wright retired from missionary work he was honored by the C.M.S for his long service.

Death 
After his missionary work Wright and wife returned to London. Wright died on September 10, 1923, in Metheringham, Lincoln, England.

References 

Wikipedia Student Program
Medical missionaries
1860 births
1923 deaths
Alumni of the Medical College of St Bartholomew's Hospital
Protestant missionaries in Palestine (region)